Pishtac (possibly from Ancash Quechua for slaughterer, is a  mountain in the Andes of Peru. It is located in the Lima Region, Cajatambo Province, Cajatambo District. Pishtac is southwest of Huayllajirca and northwest of a mountain called Chalhuacocha. A little lake named Tocto lies at its feet.

References

Mountains of Peru
Mountains of Lima Region